Baby Daisy Geyser is a geyser in the Upper Geyser Basin of Yellowstone National Park in the United States. It is part of the Old Road group of geysers.

Baby Daisy goes through periods of activity with years of inactivity in between. The most recent active period occurred from 2003 to 2004. During this time, it erupted for a duration of two and three minutes, with intervals of 33 to 39 minutes between eruptions.

Baby Daisy received its name from the fact that its eruptions are nearly identical to the Daisy Geyser although on a smaller scale. Eruptions fountain water at about 30 degrees from vertical, the same angle as Daisy Geyser.

References

External links
 

Geysers of Wyoming
Geothermal features of Teton County, Wyoming
Geothermal features of Yellowstone National Park
Geysers of Teton County, Wyoming